St Mary's Kiltoghert, is a Gaelic Athletic Association club based in the parish of Kiltoghert, near Carrick-on-Shannon, County Leitrim, Ireland. The club was re-formed in March 1944. For 55 years, the club rented the Show Grounds on the Boyle Road. They have won 5 Leitrim Senior Football Championships in 1958, 1995, 2003, 2007 and 2013, they have also won a record 31 Leitrim Senior Hurling Championships including 4 in a row between 1992 and 1995 and 12 in a row between 1999 and 2010.

Honours

 Leitrim Senior Football Championship 6:
1958, 1995, 2003, 2007, 2013, 2022
 Leitrim Senior Hurling Championship 32:
1953, 1957, 1958, 1960, 1961, 1962, 1967, 1970, 1972, 1976, 1978, 1980, 1982, 1992, 1993, 1994, 1995, 1997, 1999, 2000, 2001, 2002, 2003, 2004, 2005, 2006, 2007, 2008, 2009, 2010, 2014, 2017
 Connacht Junior Club Hurling Championship 1:
2018
 Leitrim Intermediate Football Championship: 4
 1995, 1997, 2000, 2004
 Leitrim Junior Football Championship: 5
 1945, 1953, 1956, 2002, 2014
 Leitrim Minor Football Championship: 9
 1965, 1988, 1991, 1992, 1995, 2001, 2010, 2018, 2019

References

External links
 Official website

Gaelic games clubs in County Leitrim
Gaelic football clubs in County Leitrim
Hurling clubs in County Leitrim